TV Alfa is a Bosnian commercial television channel based in Sarajevo.

Headquarters of TV Alfa are located in the building of the hotel "Radon Plaza" in Sarajevo. The program is mainly produced in the Bosnian language.

Television stations in Bosnia and Herzegovina
Mass media in Sarajevo